In the mathematical area of graph theory, the Thue number of a graph is a variation of the chromatic index, defined by  and named after mathematician Axel Thue, who studied the squarefree words used to define this number.

Alon et al. define a nonrepetitive coloring of a graph to be an assignment of colors to the edges of the graph, such that there does not exist any even-length simple path in the graph in which the colors of the edges in the first half of the path form the same sequence as the colors of the edges in the second half of the path. The Thue number of a graph is the minimum number of colors needed in any nonrepetitive coloring.

Variations on this concept involving vertex colorings or more general walks on a graph have been studied by several authors including Barát and Varjú, Barát and Wood (2005), Brešar and Klavžar (2004), and Kündgen and Pelsmajer.

Example 

Consider a pentagon, that is, a cycle of five vertices. If we color the edges with two colors, some two adjacent edges will have the same color x; the path formed by those two edges will have the repetitive color sequence xx.  If we color the edges with three colors, one of the three colors will be used only once; the path of four edges formed by the other two colors will either have two consecutive edges or will form the repetitive color sequence xyxy.  However, with four colors it is not difficult to avoid all repetitions. Therefore, the Thue number of C5 is four.

Results 

Alon et al. use the Lovász local lemma to prove that the Thue number of any graph is at most quadratic in its maximum degree; they provide an example showing that for some graphs this quadratic dependence is necessary.  In addition they show that the Thue number of a path of four or more vertices is exactly three, that the Thue number of any cycle is at most four, and that the Thue number of the Petersen graph is exactly five.

The known cycles with Thue number four are C5,  C7,  C9,  C10,  C14, and  C17. Alon et al. conjecture that the Thue number of any larger cycle is three; they verified computationally that the cycles listed above are the only ones of length ≤ 2001 with Thue number four. Currie resolved this in a 2002 paper, showing that all cycles with 18 or more vertices have Thue number 3.

Computational complexity 

Testing whether a coloring has a repetitive path is in NP, so testing whether a coloring is nonrepetitive is in co-NP, and Manin showed that it is co-NP-complete.

References

External links

Graph invariants
Graph coloring
Combinatorics on words